was a Japanese actor. He appeared in more than 100 films from 1926 to 1965.

Selected filmography

External links 

1899 births
1974 deaths
Japanese male film actors
Actors from Hyōgo Prefecture